Greg(ory) Perry is the name of:

Gregory Perry, see OpenBSD
Greg Perry (footballer) (born 1949), Australian footballer for Essendon
Greg Perry (singer) , American singer
Greg Perry, artist, see Landmark for Peace Memorial
Greg Perry, one of the Candidates of the South Australian state election, 2006